Kirkcudbrightshire is a county in Scotland.

Kirkcudbrightshire can also refer to:

Kirkcudbright Stewartry (UK Parliament constituency), also known as Kirkcudbrightshire
Kirkcudbrightshire (Parliament of Scotland constituency)